The 1999 Tirreno–Adriatico was the 34th edition of the Tirreno–Adriatico cycle race and was held from 10 March to 17 March 1999. The race started in Sorrento and finished in San Benedetto del Tronto. The race was won by Michele Bartoli of the Mapei team.

General classification

References

1999
1999 in Italian sport